is a female badminton player from Japan.

Yoshimoti competed in badminton at the 2004 Summer Olympics in women's doubles with partner Chikako Nakayama.  They had a bye in the first round and were defeated by Saralee Thungthongkam and Sathinee Chankrachangwong of Thailand in the round of 16.

Link
2004Japanese Olympic Committee

1975 births
Living people
Badminton players at the 2004 Summer Olympics
Olympic badminton players of Japan
Japanese female badminton players
Badminton coaches